Krzysztof Jotko (born August 19, 1989) is a Polish mixed martial artist currently competing  in the Light Heavyweight division of Professional Fighters League (PFL). He has previously fought in the Ultimate Fighting Championship.

Background
Born and raised in Orneta, Poland, Jotko was originally a breakdancer. He started training mixed martial arts after seeing one of the Tito Ortiz vs. Ken Shamrock bouts in TV. After finishing school, he moved to Warsaw where he continued training for his amateur career in the sport. He is married and lives in South Florida with his wife Amanda Hernandez, a nurse.

Mixed martial arts career

Early career
Jotko faced Bojan Veličković at MMA Attack 3 on April 27, 2013. He won the via majority decision, in a fight that earned both fighters "Fight of the Night" honors.

Ultimate Fighting Championship
Jotko made his promotional debut facing Bruno Santos at UFC Fight Night 33 on December 7, 2013. He won the fight via unanimous decision.

He then faced Magnus Cedenblad at UFC Fight Night 41 on May 31, 2014. Jotko lost the fight via guillotine choke submission, ending his undefeated streak.

Jotko faced Tor Troéng on October 4, 2014 at UFC Fight Night 53. He won the fight by unanimous decision.

Jotko was expected to face Derek Brunson on June 20, 2015 at UFC Fight Night 69.  However, Brunson pulled out of the fight on June 9 citing a rib injury and was briefly replaced by Uriah Hall. Three days after the booking, Hall was removed due to an alleged visa issue.  In turn, Jotko was removed from the card entirely.

Jotko faced Scott Askham on October 24, 2015 at UFC Fight Night 76. He won the fight by split decision.

Jotko faced Brad Scott on February 27, 2016 at UFC Fight Night 84. He won the fight by unanimous decision.

Jotko next faced Tamdan McCrory on June 18, 2016 at UFC Fight Night 89. He won the fight via knockout in the first round and was awarded a Performance of the Night bonus.

Jotko faced Thales Leites on November 19, 2016 at UFC Fight Night 100. He won the fight via unanimous decision.

Jotko faced David Branch on May 13, 2017 at UFC 211. He lost the fight via split decision.

Jotko faced Uriah Hall on September 16, 2017 at UFC Fight Night 116. He lost the fight via KO in the second round.

Jotko faced Brad Tavares on April 14, 2018 at UFC on Fox 29. He lost the fight via technical knock out on round three.

Jotko was scheduled to face Adam Yandiev in September 2018 at UFC Fight Night 136. However, Jotko pulled out of the fight on August 16 citing injury and was replaced by Jordan Johnson.

Jotko was expected to face newcomer Roman Kopylov on April 20, 2019 at UFC Fight Night 149. However, Kopylov pulled out of the bout on March 22 citing injury and was replaced by Alen Amedovski. Jotko won the fight via unanimous decision.

Jotko faced Marc-André Barriault  July 27, 2019 at UFC 240. He won the fight via split decision.

Jotko was expected to face Edmen Shahbazyan on November 2, 2019 at UFC 244. However, Jotko withdrew from the bout and was replaced by Brad Tavares.

Jotko was scheduled to face Eryk Anders on April 11, 2020 at UFC Fight Night: Overeem vs. Harris. Due to the COVID-19 pandemic, the event was eventually postponed to May 16, 2020 at UFC on ESPN: Overeem vs. Harris. He won the fight via unanimous decision.

Jotko was scheduled to face Makhmud Muradov on October 31, 2020 at UFC Fight Night 181. However, Jotko was pulled from the event, citing injury, and he was replaced by Kevin Holland.

Jotko faced Sean Strickland on May 1, 2021 at UFC on ESPN: Reyes vs. Procházka. He lost the bout via unanimous decision.

As the last fight of his prevailing contract, Jotko faced Misha Cirkunov on October 2, 2021 at UFC Fight Night 193. He won the fight via split decision.

Jotko faced Gerald Meerschaert on April 30, 2022 at UFC on ESPN 35. He won the bout via unanimous decision.

Jotko faced Brendan Allen on October 1, 2022 at UFC Fight Night: Dern vs. Yan. He lost the bout at the end of the first round, getting submitted via rear-naked choke.

After his loss, it was announced at the end of October that he was no longer on the UFC roster.

Professional Fighters League 
Jotko is set to start the 2023 season against Will Fleury on April 1, 2023 at PFL 1.

Championships and accomplishments

Mixed martial arts
MMA Attack
Fight of the Night (One time) vs. Bojan Veličković
The Ultimate Fighting Championship
Performance of the Night (One time) vs. Tamdan McCrory
Tied (with Gray Maynard) for second highest decision wins per win percentage in UFC History (10 decision wins / 11 wins: 90.7%)
 Most split decision wins in UFC middleweight history (3) (Tied with Brad Tavares)

Mixed martial arts record

|-
|Loss
|align=center|24–6
|Brendan Allen
|Submission (rear-naked choke)
|UFC Fight Night: Dern vs. Yan
|
|align=center|1
|align=center|4:17
|Las Vegas, Nevada, United States
|
|-
|Win
|align=center|24–5
|Gerald Meerschaert
|Decision (unanimous)
|UFC on ESPN: Font vs. Vera 
|
|align=center|3
|align=center|5:00
|Las Vegas, Nevada, United States
|
|-
|Win
|align=center|23–5
|Misha Cirkunov
|Decision (split)
|UFC Fight Night: Santos vs. Walker
|
|align=center|3
|align=center|5:00
|Las Vegas, Nevada, United States
|
|-
|Loss
|align=center|22–5
|Sean Strickland
|Decision (unanimous)
|UFC on ESPN: Reyes vs. Procházka
|
|align=center|3
|align=center|5:00
|Las Vegas, Nevada, United States
|
|-
|Win
|align=center|22–4
|Eryk Anders
|Decision (unanimous)
|UFC on ESPN: Overeem vs. Harris
|
|align=center|3
|align=center|5:00
|Jacksonville, Florida, United States
|
|-
|Win
|align=center|21–4
|Marc-André Barriault
|Decision (split)
|UFC 240 
|
|align=center|3
|align=center|5:00
|Edmonton, Alberta, Canada
|
|-
|Win
|align=center|20–4
|Alen Amedovski
|Decision (unanimous)
|UFC Fight Night: Overeem vs. Oleinik 
|
|align=center|3
|align=center|5:00
|Saint Petersburg, Russia
|
|-
|Loss
|align=center|19–4
|Brad Tavares
|TKO (punches)
|UFC on Fox: Poirier vs. Gaethje
|
|align=center|3
|align=center|2:16
|Glendale, Arizona, United States
|
|-
|Loss
|align=center|19–3
|Uriah Hall
|TKO (punches)
|UFC Fight Night: Rockhold vs. Branch 
|
|align=center|2
|align=center|2:25
|Pittsburgh, Pennsylvania, United States
|
|-
|Loss
|align=center|19–2
|David Branch
|Decision (split)
|UFC 211
|
|align=center|3
|align=center|5:00
|Dallas, Texas, United States
|
|-
|Win
|align=center|19–1 
|Thales Leites
| Decision (unanimous)
|UFC Fight Night: Bader vs. Nogueira 2
|
|align=center| 3
|align=center| 5:00
|São Paulo, Brazil
|  
|-
|Win
|align=center|18–1
|Tamdan McCrory
| KO (punches)
|UFC Fight Night: MacDonald vs. Thompson
|
|align=center|1
|align=center|0:59
|Ottawa, Ontario, Canada
|
|-
|Win
|align=center|17–1
|Brad Scott
| Decision (unanimous)
|UFC Fight Night: Silva vs. Bisping
|
|align=center|3
|align=center|5:00
|London, England
|
|-
|Win
|align=center|16–1
|Scott Askham
| Decision (split)
|UFC Fight Night: Holohan vs. Smolka
|
|align=center|3
|align=center|5:00
|Dublin, Ireland
| 
|-
|Win
|align=center|15–1
|Tor Troéng
|Decision (unanimous)
|UFC Fight Night: Nelson vs. Story
|
|align=center|3
|align=center|5:00
|Stockholm, Sweden
|
|-
|Loss
|align=center|14–1
|Magnus Cedenblad
|Submission (guillotine choke)
|UFC Fight Night: Munoz vs. Mousasi
|
|align=center|2
|align=center|4:59
|Berlin, Germany
|
|-
|Win
|align=center|14–0
|Bruno Santos
|Decision (unanimous)
|UFC Fight Night: Hunt vs. Bigfoot
|
|align=center|3
|align=center|5:00
|Brisbane, Australia
|
|-
|Win
|align=center|13–0
|Bojan Veličković
|Decision (majority)
|MMA Attack 3
|
|align=center|3
|align=center|5:00
|Katowice, Poland
|
|-
|Win
|align=center|12–0
|Martin Zawada
|Decision (split)
|Fight Night Merseburg 5
|
|align=center|3
|align=center|5:00
|Merseburg, Germany
|
|-
|Win
|align=center|11–0
|Fabian Loewke
|Submission (rear-naked choke)
|Fight Night Merseburg 5
|
|align=center|2
|align=center|1:12
|Merseburg, Germany
|
|-
|Win
|align=center|10–0
|Damir Hadžović
|Decision (unanimous)
|MMA Attack 2
|
|align=center|3
|align=center|5:00
|Poznań, Poland
|
|-
|Win
|align=center|9–0
|Tomasz Kondraciuk
|TKO (submission to punches)
|X Fight Series: Night of Champions 3
|
|align=center|2
|align=center|4:08
|Międzychód, Poland
|
|-
|Win
|align=center|8–0
|Krzysztof Sadecki
|Decision (unanimous)
|Pro Fight 6
|
|align=center|3
|align=center|5:00
|Włocławek, Poland
|
|-
|Win
|align=center|7–0
|Michal Lutka
|TKO (punches)
|Fight Club Koszalin
|
|align=center|1
|align=center|3:09
|Koszalin, Poland
| 
|-
|Win
|align=center|6–0
|Oskar Ślepowroński
|TKO (doctor stoppage)
|Chelm Fight Night
|
|align=center|1
|align=center|4:09
|Chełm, Poland
|
|-
|Win
|align=center|5–0
|Shamil Ilyasov
|TKO (punches)
|ZSSC: Martial Arts Night 4
|
|align=center|1
|align=center|N/A
|Ząbkowice Śląskie, Poland
|
|-
|Win
|align=center| 4–0
|Przemyslaw Truszewski
|TKO (doctor stoppage)
|ZSSC: Martial Arts Night 4
|
|align=center|2
|align=center|N/A
|Ząbkowice Śląskie, Poland
|
|-
|Win
|align=center|3–0
|Lukasz Nikolajczyk
|Decision (unanimous)
|ZSSC: Martial Arts Night 4
|
|align=center|2
|align=center|5:00
|Ząbkowice Śląskie, Poland
|
|-
|Win
|align=center|2–0
|Maciej Browarski
|Decision (unanimous)
|Black Dragon: Fight Show
|
|align=center|2
|align=center|5:00
|Andrychów, Poland
|
|-
|Win
|align=center| 1–0
|Robert Balicki
|Decision (unanimous)
|Pro Fight 5
|
|align=center|2
|align=center|5:00
|Wrocław, Poland
|
|}

See also
 List of current PFL fighters
 List of male mixed martial artists

References

External links

1989 births
Living people
Polish male mixed martial artists
People from Elbląg
Middleweight mixed martial artists
Mixed martial artists utilizing Brazilian jiu-jitsu
Polish practitioners of Brazilian jiu-jitsu
Ultimate Fighting Championship male fighters